Clouds is an unincorporated community in Claiborne County, Tennessee.

History
A post office called Clouds was established in 1913, and remained in operation until 1954. The community has the name of an early settler.

References

Unincorporated communities in Claiborne County, Tennessee
Unincorporated communities in Tennessee